{{Speciesbox
| image = Acanthoderes quadrigibba (48104076953).jpg
| taxon = Aegomorphus quadrigibbus
| authority = (Say, 1831)
| synonyms = *Acanthocinus quadrigibbus Say, 1831Acanthoderes quadrigibba (Say, 1831) (misspelling)Psapharochrus quadrigibbus lucidus Knull, 1958
}}Aegomorphus quadrigibbus'' is a species of beetle in the family Cerambycidae. It was described by Say in 1831.

References

Aegomorphus
Beetles described in 1831